Rajnagar is a census town in Rajnagar CD block in Suri Sadar subdivision of Birbhum district in the Indian state of West Bengal. It was formerly the capital of Royal Kingdoms in the area. With the fading away of the kingdoms, the town lost much of its importance.

History
Rajnagar was founded by Bir Singh, a great Hindu Raja in ancient times on whose name the district Birbhum was formed. In 1206, Rajnagar was occupied by Muhammad Shiran, a General of Muhammad Bakhtiyar, and annexed by Ali Mardan, on 1211. However, Pathans do not seem to have enjoyed undisputed control over the entire district or area. At least the western part of the district, with Rajnagar as its capital, seems to have been ruled by the descendants of Bir Singh, the Bir Rajas. The rent roll of Todar Mal leads to the conclusion that by the middle of the 16th century the entire district was brought under the administration of the Mughals through numerous wars raged on this 'Gateway of Bengal'. The later Muslim Zamindars of Rajnagar, known as "Nagar Raj", were feudatories of the Mughals.

Nagar Raj

Jonad Khan, an adventurous Pathan, is said to have established the House at Nagar in 1600, having treachouresly killed the Bir Raja under whom he served. He was succeeded by his son, Bahadur Khan, alias Ranmast Khan. Asadullah Khan (1697-1718), grandson of Bahadur Khan, was a pious man who was on good terms with Murshid Quli Khan, the Nawab of Bengal. A devout person, he enjoyed full autonomy.

His son, Badi-uz-zaman Khan (1718–52) made an abortive attempt at shaking off the nominal allegiance to Murshidabad. He was invested with the title of Raja by Murshid Quli Khan. During his reign Birbhum was ravaged by the Marathas. They also overran Rajnagar. It was during the reign of his son, Asad-uz-Zaman Khan (1752-1777) that the Nagar Raj witnessed the zenith of its power and then started declining. The Raja was faithful to the Nawab and after the Battle of Plassey, was on bad terms with the British. He was defeated by the combined forces of the British and Mir Qasim in 1761. He fled, regrouped and fought back again. He was completely routed at the Battle of Hetampur in 1765. By a treaty, he was restored to his estate but much of his autonomy was lost.
In the course of time, they lost their supremacy to the Hetampur Raj. The British set up their district headquarters at Suri, and by the early 19th century, Rajnagar had been reduced to a deserted town with dilapidated palaces and ruins of habitation, and the forest slowly encroaching.

Nostalgia
The last Pathan ruler held sway over the area in the mid-19th century, but Rafiqul Alam Khan, a successor of the Nagar Raj family, is still honoured as the Raja by the town's residents, the descendants of the one-time tenants of his predecessors. On the occasion of the Muslim festivals of Muharram and Eid, he regains his position as the Raja of Rajnagar. The present Raja did not get a realm from his ancestors but is the proud owner of a royal attire with a royal diadem made of silk. The attire is tattered, but Raja Saheb still wears it when he becomes the "ruler" — twice a year.

Geography

Location
It is located on the western edge of the district, bordering on Jharkhand. The area sits on ancient Archean rocks. Rajnagar receives an average annual rainfall of 1405 mm, most of it in the months of June to October. The area has laterite soil, which is infertile and unsuitable for agriculture.

Suri, 25 km away, is connected by a road.

Police station
Rajnagar police station has jurisdiction over Rajnagar CD block.

CD block HQ
The headquarters of Rajnagar CD block are located at Rajnagar.

Demographics
As per the 2011 Census of India, Rajnagar had a total population of 13,965 of which 7,173 (51%) were males and 6,792 (49%) were females. Population below 6 years was 1,771. The total number of literates in Rajnagar was 8,845 (72.54% of the population over 6 years).

Infrastructure
As per the District Census Handbook 2011, Rajnagar covered an area of 9.4773 km2. It has 7 km roads and open drains. The major source of protected water supply is from bore well pumping. There are 1,923 domestic electric connections. Amongst the medical facilities it has are 3 medicine shops. Amongst the educational facilities it has are 7 primary schools, 1 secondary school and 1 senior secondary school. Amongst the recreational and cultural facilities it has 3 cinema theatres, 1 public library and 1 reading room. It has branches of 1 nationalised bank, 1 private commercial bank and 1 agricultural credit society. Amongst the commodities it produces are wooden furniture, lead industry and bamboo products.

Economy
Proximity to the supply centres of raw material, as well as the royal court and an aristocratic community, gave rise to certain centres of cottage industries for cotton and tasar silk in the Tantipara-Bhabanipur-Karidhya zone. The famine of 1770 left both agriculture and industry in a bad shape. Trade also suffered. People had sunk to a depth of poverty which the magistrate of Birbhum emphatically said he had not seen anywhere in India. The Maratha raids of 1742-45 had earlier laid waste not only the countryside but also Rajnagar itself.

Transport

Railway
The nearest railway station is Siuri.

Road
The State Highway 6 originates from Rajnagar. Buses are available in the town for larger cities like Suri, Bolpur etc.

Education
Rajnagar Mahavidyalaya

Culture

Places of interest

Kalidaha, a pond, is said to have been excavated by Hindu Rajas and dedicated to goddess Kali. There is an island in the middle of the pond. It is believed to have been connected with the palace through a tunnel. On three sides of Kalidaha tank there are the wings of the former palaces of Muslim Rajas. In front of the ruins of the Imambara stands a fine Mosque in a state of good preservation, which is still used by local Muslims. A little to the south are the ruins of another old mosque called the Motichur Masjid which had 12 towers but some have fallen down. This mosque was built of Terracotta and protected by Government of West Bengal. Other important sites to be mentioned are 'Nahabatkhana' of the Bir Rajas, and Fulbagan burial place of the Muslim Rajas.

Craft
The National Institute of Fashion Technology has trained almost 2000 artisans from various parts of Birbhum in handicraft and handloom as a part of its consolidated cluster development project undertaken in collaboration with the ministry of rural development and its counterpart in the state. Estimated at Rs 15 crore this project is underway in five selected parts of the country. The main project in the eastern zone was implemented in Bolpur, Nalhati, Ilambazar and Rajnagar.

References

Cities and towns in Birbhum district